Nirbashito ( exiled) (2014) is a Bengali-language film directed by Churni Ganguly. The music of the film was composed by Raja Narayan Deb. The film was India's Oscar nomination in the category "Best foreign film" in 2015.

Plot 

The protagonist of the film is a female writer who has been banished from her own country for writing against religious fundamentalism. The film shows the relationship between her and her cat "Baghini".

Cast 
 Churni Ganguly as a Woman 
 Saswata Chatterjee as Pritam 
 Arindol Bagchi as Anukul 
 Raima Sen as Shayonti 
 Ardhendu Banerjee as Shayonti's Father 
 Dipankar Dey as Chief Minister
 Chitravanu Basu as Kalidas 
 Dipanjan Basu as Identity Verification officer 
 Lars Bethke as Lucas 
 Naomi Bethke as Girl in Apple Orchard. 
 Gautam Bhattacharya as Journalist in School library 
 Kishore Bhimani as Mr. Goenka 
 Sanjay Biswas as Consulate Stuff 
 Lia Boysen as Wilma 
 Biplab Chatterjee as Moti 
 Balmiki Chattopadhyay as Debu 
 Kheya Chattopadhyay as Courier Service  Assistant 
 Shruti Das as Girl Crying for mother  
 Rajorshi Dey as Manibul 
 Kaushik Ganguly as Jayanta 
 Rajat Ganguly as Chanchal 
 Abhimanyu Mukherjee Television Journalist 
 Parna Ghatak as Vet 
 Joakim Granberg as Theo 
 Christer Holmgren as Swedish Ambassador 
 Yohanna Idha as Reporter 
 Christoffer L Jonsson as Swedish Security Official 1 
 Bharat Kaul as Vikram Ehsas. 
 Eric Krogh as Bodyguard 
 Debmalya Maulik as Newsreader 
 Arun Mukherjee as Amal Majumdar 
 Ashok Mukherjee as Courier Service Stuff 
 Sumanta Mukherjee as Commissioner of Police  
 Samita Saha as Maid for Baghini 
 Martin Wallström as Gustav 
 Shazi Özdemir as Liliana 
 Lennart B. Sandelin as Protestor

Awards 
The film received the following awards:
 Best Bengali film - 2015 - 62nd National Film Awards, India
 Best film at Delhi International Film Festival - 2014

References

External links 
 

Bengali-language Indian films
2010s Bengali-language films
2014 films
Films that won the Best Audiography National Film Award
Best Bengali Feature Film National Film Award winners
Films scored by Raja Narayan Deb